"" is the national anthem of Somaliland, a self-declared republic that is internationally recognized as an autonomous region of Somalia.

History 
The short-lived State of Somaliland used a composition written by local musicians and transcribed by British military bandmaster R.A.Y. Mitchell as its anthem during its brief period of independence between 26 June 1960 and 1 July 1960, when it merged into the Somali Republic.

The anthem was written and composed by Hassan Sheikh Mumin, a famous Somali playwright and composer. The anthem was adopted in 1997 and is sung in Somali.

Lyrics

Notes

References

External links
Redsea Online
YouTube (archive link)

Culture of Somaliland
National anthems
African anthems
National anthem compositions in F major